= Padari Mustarka =

Padari Mustarka is a village in Uttar Pradesh, India.
